The Academy of Fine Arts in Gdańsk (Akademia Sztuk Pięknych w Gdańsku) was founded in 1945 in Sopot, Poland as the State Institute of Fine Arts, later renamed the State College of Fine Arts in Gdańsk. In 1954, the headquarters were moved from Sopot to Gdańsk, to the rebuilt Great Armory. In 1968, the university gained a new, modernist wing designed by the university professor Ryszard Semka. Since 1996 it has had the status of an Academy of Fine Arts.

The Great Armoury (Wielka Zbrojownia) is in the centre of the city with two prominent towers. The academy’s art collection is displayed in the Gallery of the Small Lecture Theatre and is made up of the work of artists who have been or are connected with the academy.  Since 2017 there has also been a Design Gallery. 

It enrolls less than 1000 students.

References

Academy of Fine Arts in Gdańsk
Education in Gdańsk